The North American Toyota-Denso Cup - World Go Oza was a qualifying tournament for the now defunct Toyota-Denso Cup ("World Oza"). Since the second running of the event, the sponsors invited North America to send two representatives to the world championship tournament. 

Held as a biennial event in even-numbered years starting in 2002, the tournament ran as a 32-player knockout event that culminated in a best-of-three final match. The Nihon Ki-in confirmed that the Toyota & Denso Cup World Go Oza had been canceled by the sponsors in 2009.

Past North American winners

Go competitions in North America